Brite Winter is a music and arts festival held annually in Cleveland, Ohio with the mission of embracing Cleveland's winter "by celebrating with light, fire, art, music, games and snow." Hosting its inaugural event in 2010, Brite Winter has since grown to a six-stage, 60-band event. The event hosted 20,000 attendees at its 2015 festival.

History
The Brite Winter Music & Arts Festival was founded in 2010 by Emily Hornack and Jimmy Harris. Some of the funding for the 2014 festival was acquired through corporate sponsors and a Kickstarter campaign with a $4,000 goal. The 2014 event had over 20,000 attendees.

References

Further reading
Brite Winter helps Clevelanders embrace the cold with unique music and art festival in Ohio City | cleveland.com
Brite Winter Fest large crowd embraces cold temperatures for bands and beer (video, photos) | cleveland.com
Brite Winter Tees Up More Expansive Visual Arts Offerings This Year | Scene and Heard: Scene's News Blog | Cleveland Scene
Brite Winter Art & Music Festival | CoolCleveland
#010: Live from Brite Winter 2015 - Loud in Cleveland
Brite Winter Festival | Cleveland
The Observer : Ohio City comes to life for Brite Winter
Brite Winter fest 2015 lineup announced: 60 bands heading to 8 stages in Cleveland's Ohio City | cleveland.com
Brite Cleveland / Brite Winter Festival | Spindrift Management Group
Brite Winter Announces Return to the Flats | Scene and Heard: Scene's News Blog | Cleveland Scene
Brite Winter Announces New Location and Other 2016 Details | Cellar Door Cleveland
Brite Winter + Thrive, February 21st - Thrive ClevelandThrive Cleveland
Brite Winter 2015 « Cleveland's Star 102

External links
 Clevelandarts.org
 Freshwatercleveland.com

Music festivals in Ohio
Music of Cleveland
Festivals in Cleveland